Arangetram may refer to:
 Arangetram (dance), the debut performance in Indian classical dance and music
 Arangetram (film), a 1973 Indian Tamil-language drama film
 Arangetram (TV series), a 2014 Indian-Tamil-language soap opera